Colonel Crawford High School is a public high school in Whetstone Township, near North Robinson, Ohio, United States.  It is the only high school in the Colonel Crawford Local School District. The school had an enrollment of 281 students as of the 2018–19 school year and the principal is Jake Bruner.  The school is named for Colonel William Crawford. The St. Lawrence Continental Divide passes through the northern portion of the campus.

Athletics

State championships
 Girls track and field – 1990, 1991, 1992, 2022
 Girls softball – 1995
 Boys track and field – 2010

Notes and references

External links
 

High schools in Crawford County, Ohio
Public high schools in Ohio